Owen Pappoe (born September 29, 2000) is an American football linebacker for the Auburn Tigers.

Early years
Pappoe attended Grayson High School in Loganville, Georgia. As a senior, he had 121 tackles. He played in the 2019 Under Armour All-America Game. A five-star recruit, Pappoe committed to Auburn University to play college football.

College career
Pappoe entered his true freshman season at Auburn in 2019 as a starter. He started all 13 games, recording 49 tackles and two sacks. He returned to Auburn as a starter his sophomore year in 2020 and recorded 93 tackles and 4 sacks. Due to injuries, Pappoe only appeared in 5 games for Auburn in 2021.

References

External links
Auburn Tigers bio

Living people
People from Lawrenceville, Georgia
Players of American football from Georgia (U.S. state)
American football linebackers
Auburn Tigers football players
2000 births